The Boston College School of Theology and Ministry (STM) is a Jesuit school of graduate theology at Boston College. It is an ecclesiastical faculty of theology that trains men and women, both lay and religious, for scholarship and service, especially within the Catholic Church.

Boston College's School of Theology and Ministry and Theology Department ranked 10th among universities worldwide in Theology, Divinity, and Religious studies in the 2020 QS World University Rankings. It was one of two Catholic institutions, along with the University of Notre Dame, in the top 10.

History
The School of Theology and Ministry was founded in the merger of Weston Jesuit School of Theology and Boston College Institute for Religious Education and Pastoral Ministry on June 1, 2008.

Weston College opened in 1922 as a center of philosophy for the New England Province of the Jesuits in Weston, Massachusetts. Weston College expanded in 1927 to prepare men for ordination, and later to include religious and lay men and women, as the Weston Jesuit School of Theology.

Historically, the School of Theology at Weston College was listed in the Boston College course catalog as a constituent school of the university, with the names of theological degree graduates in the commencement program. But the connection between Boston College and Weston College was non-legal and had never been properly defined, according to university historians.

Meanwhile, Weston College in 1967 joined with Boston College and five other theological institutions to form the Boston Theological Institute (BTI), increasing cooperation and academic opportunities in the spirit of the Second Vatican Council. For the first time, Weston College matriculated students in its theology programs who were not members of the Jesuit order. In 1968, Weston College moved to Cambridge, Massachusetts and also became one of the first three Catholic schools accredited by the Association of Theological Schools in 1968.

In 1971, Boston College opened a summer Institute of Religious Education and Service, which later became known as the Institute of Religious Education and Pastoral Ministry (IREPM), offering hands-on ministerial training to men and women. The Institute expanded its academic offerings and awarded its first degree in 1975.

In 1974, the arrangement between Weston College and Boston College ceased, and Weston College changed its name to Weston School of Theology. 

In December 2004, Boston College announced plans to create a School of Theology and Ministry by merging the Institute for Religious Education and Pastoral Ministry and the Weston Jesuit School of Theology. The reaffiliation of Weston Jesuit School of Theology with Boston College took place in 2008, and the new school was moved to Boston College's campus in Brighton, purchased in 2006. These buildings formerly housed the chancery of the Archdiocese of Boston and portions of St. John's Seminary. In September 2015, Simboli Hall, home of the School of Theology and Ministry, was dedicated in recognition of alumnus and real estate developer Anthony C. Simboli and his wife Gloria.

The Boston College School of Theology and Ministry is one of the two schools in the United States where Jesuits receive theological training prior to ordination to the priesthood, the other being Jesuit School of Theology of Santa Clara University. The School of Theology and Ministry offers an array of ministerial and theological courses and degrees.

Academics
The School of Theology and Ministry is both a graduate divinity school and an ecclesiastical faculty of theology regulated by the Apostolic Constitution Sapientia Christiana (1979) and accredited by the Association of Theological Schools in the United States and Canada. It offers both master and doctoral degrees, civil and ecclesiastical degrees, and a wide variety of continuing education offerings, including online programs through C21 Online.

Master of Divinity (M.Div.)
Master of Arts in Theology and Ministry (M.A.)
Master of Theological Studies (M.T.S.)
Master of Theology (Th.M.)
Doctor of Philosophy in Theology and Education (Ph.D.)
Bachelor's of Sacred Theology (S.T.B.)
Licentiate in Sacred Theology (S.T.L.)
Doctor of Philosophy in Sacred Theology (S.T.D.)

Faculty
There are approximately 29 full-time faculty members at the School of Theology and Ministry, in addition to about 32 members of the Morrissey College Department of Theology at Boston College with which students are able to work and take classes. The School of Theology and Ministry faculty can be divided according to their research in the following fields:
     
 Historical Theology
 Systematic Theology 
 Practical Theology
 Church History
    
 Moral Theology
 Biblical Studies
 Religious Education 
   
 Pastoral Counseling
 Canon Law
 Liturgical Theology

Student demographics
Enrollment at the School of Theology and Ministry is approximately 420 students. While the majority of students at the STM are Catholic, it is also home to a number of Anglican/Episcopal, Methodist, Lutheran, Evangelical, Orthodox, Presbyterian, Unitarian Universalist, Nondenominational, Buddhist, and Hindu students. The student body includes representatives from 27 nations and 6 continents, and students range in age from 21 to 74 years old. Laypersons comprise 65% of the students at the STM while 35% represent a religious order or are diocesan priests. Lay students in all programs study alongside Jesuit scholars.

Theology and Ministry Library
The Theology and Ministry Library is located on the Brighton Campus. It is open to all Boston College students, faculty and staff, and is a part of the Boston College Library System. Integrating the former collections of Weston Jesuit School of Theology and St. John's Seminary, it contains more than 2.44 million volumes. The library also participates in the Boston Theological Institute library program, which allows School of Theology and Ministry students to borrow materials from any of the other BTI libraries.

New Testament Abstracts
The School of Theology and Ministry publishes New Testament Abstracts, a research and bibliographic aid for scholars, librarians, clergy, and students of the New Testament and its historical milieu. The journal has been in publication since 1956, and each year it abstracts approximately 1,500 articles, selected from over 500 periodicals in different languages, as well as hundreds of books. New Testament Abstracts is published three times per year.

Deans
 Rev. Richard J. Clifford, S.J. (2008-2010)
 Rev. Mark S. Massa, S.J. (2010-2016)
 Rev. Thomas D. Stegman, S.J. (2016–present)

Notable alumni
 Leo J. O'Donovan, president of Georgetown University
 Jeffrey Paul von Arx, president of Fairfield University
 Kevin Wildes, president of Loyola University New Orleans
 J. Donald Freeze, provost at Georgetown University
 David O'Leary, former university chaplain at Tufts University
 Robert Araujo, John Courtney Murray Professor at Loyola University Chicago School of Law
 Katarina Schuth, Endowed Professor for the Social Scientific Study of Religion at the Saint Paul Seminary School of Divinity at the University of St. Thomas
 Joseph Koterski, Associate Professor of Philosophy, Fordham University
 Michael Holman, Provincial of the British Province of the Society of Jesus
 Richard Joseph Malone, Bishop of Portland from 2004-2012 and then Bishop of Buffalo
 James Martin, Jesuit priest, writer and editor-at-large for the Jesuit magazine America
 T. J. Martinez, founding president of Cristo Rey Jesuit College Preparatory of Houston
 Greg Boyle, Founding Director of Homeboy Industries
 Thomas Worcester, president of Regis College, Toronto
 Daniel J. Harrington, Jesuit priest and noted New Testament scholar

See also
 Boston College
 Pontifical university
 Jesuit School of Theology of Santa Clara University
 List of Jesuit sites

References

External links
 

Boston College
Educational institutions established in 1922
1922 establishments in Massachusetts
Jesuit universities and colleges in the United States
Seminaries and theological colleges in Massachusetts
Christianity in Boston
Pontifical universities
Catholic seminaries in the United States
Educational institutions established in 2008
2008 establishments in Massachusetts